Walter Knaus Chorn (January 21, 1885 – February 26, 1933) was a college football player, lawyer, and one time insurance superintendent of Missouri.

University

Chorn attended Central College in Fayette, Missouri and Vanderbilt University in Nashville, Tennessee. He graduated from the latter with an LL.B. Chorn was a guard and tackle for Dan McGugin's Vanderbilt Commodores football teams, selected All-Southern in 1906, and second-team on an all-time Vanderbilt football team selected in 1912. At Vanderbilt he was a member of Kappa Sigma.

Legal career
After graduation, he opened a law office in Fayette, Missouri, practicing for two years. In 1909 he became chief clerk of the commission that revised the Missouri statutes. In 1910 and 1911 he served in the state auditor's office, and in 1913 was chief clerk of the Supreme Court of Missouri.

References

External links

1885 births
1933 deaths
American football guards
American football tackles
All-Southern college football players
Players of American football from Missouri
Vanderbilt Commodores football players
Missouri lawyers
People from Fayette, Missouri
20th-century American lawyers